Godoberi (also rendered Ghodoberi; self-designation Ghibdilhi mittsi) is an Andic language of the Northeast Caucasian language family spoken by the Godoberi in southwestern Dagestan, Russia. It is spoken by approximately 130 people out of an ethnic population of 3,000. There are two dialects - Godoberi and Zibirhali, which differ mainly in pronunciation.

History 
The history of the Godoberis is unknown. The Godoberi language is the main thing distinguishes the cultural group from other groups in the area. When compared to other Andic languages, Godoberi is most similar to Chamalal and Botlikh. Some words are borrowed from by Avar, Turkish, and Arabic. After being incorporated into the Russian Empire in the 19th century and then ruled by the Soviet Union in the 20th century, there is a strong Russian influence in the Godoberi language.

Geographic Distribution 
Native speakers of Godoberi live in two villages: Godoberi (Gjudu in Godoberi) and Zibirhali (Shalu in Godoberi). These villages are located in the mountains on the left bank of the Andi-Koisu River in Southwest Dagestan, a republic of Russia.

Status 
Godoberi is not a written language, and it is used only in the home. Schools teach Avar and Russian. Native speakers of Godoberi use Avar or Russian as a written language. These two languages are also used when speaking to people from neighboring communities.

Phonology 
Diphthongs are found only in Godoberi and in no other Daghestanain languages (example: cʼai 'fire'). There are 13 phonemic vowels: i, e, a, o, u, iː, eː, aː, oː, uː, ĩ, ã, ũ. 

The consonant system is as follows:

The accent system is extremely complex, especially for nouns.

Morphology 
Singular words have three genders: masculine, feminine, and neuter. Plural words lack those three genders and instead have two noun classes: human or inanimate object. There are two types of adjectives: primary and participles. A majority of the primary adjectives do not have gender. The four types of participles are past, present, future, and non-future negative. The numerical system does not vary greatly from other languages. Verb morphology is also regular compared to other languages in the Andic language family.

Provisional writing systems 
The Godoberi language is unwritten. The following transcription is used in a recent dictionary of the language.

Э is used in initial position, е elsewhere. Acute accents are used for stress, but not treated as creating distinct letters.

The letters shown in the phonology section above were used in an older grammatical description.

References

Further reading 
 

Northeast Caucasian languages
Andic languages
Languages of Russia
Endangered Caucasian languages